Sander Arends (born 9 August 1991) is a Dutch professional tennis player.

Arends has a career-high Association of Tennis Professionals (ATP) doubles ranking of world No. 55, achieved on 16 July 2019, and also attained his singles career-high ranking of world No. 1057 in January 2015. Arends has won one doubles ATP title with David Pel and 16 ATP Challenger doubles titles. He reached two ATP Tour doubles finals partnering Matwé Middelkoop and one with David Pel.

ATP career finals

Doubles: 4 (1 title, 3 runner-ups)

Challenger and Futures finals

Doubles: 54 (31–23)

External links
 
 

1991 births
Living people
Dutch male tennis players
Sportspeople from Leeuwarden
21st-century Dutch people